Joe Ferris was an American college baseball pitcher who won the 1964 College World Series Most Outstanding Player award while a sophomore at University of Maine. He is the only player from University of Maine to win that award.

In 1964, he played collegiate summer baseball with the Bourne Canalmen of the Cape Cod Baseball League. He was inducted into the University of Maine Hall of Fame in 1988.

References

Maine Black Bears baseball players
College World Series Most Outstanding Player Award winners
Year of birth missing (living people)
Living people
Baseball pitchers
1940s births
Baseball players from Maine
Bourne Braves players